is a shōnen adventure and racing manga. It was serialized in Weekly Shōnen Jump from January 1975 to June 1979 issues.

The live action film of Circuit no Ōkami, directed by Kazuhiko Yamaguchi, was released in Japan on August 6, 1977.

The sequel to Circuit no Ōkami, was also published by Shueisha.

Circuit no Ōkami II was adapted into an OVA, released December 21, 1990.

Manga

Second edition

Circuit no Ōkami

Circuit no Ōkami II: Modena no Tsurugi

References

External links
 
 
 Satoshi Ikezawa's official homepage 

1975 manga
1977 films
1989 manga
1990 anime OVAs
Animated films based on manga
Films directed by Kazuhiko Yamaguchi
Gainax
Japanese auto racing films
Manga adapted into films
Motorsports in anime and manga
Shōnen manga
Seinen manga
Shueisha franchises
Shueisha manga
Live-action films based on manga
1970s Japanese films